Good Grief is the third studio album by Brooklyn indie pop band Lucius. Released on PIAS Recordings, Mom + Pop Music and Dine Alone Records, their second album peaked at number 92 on the Billboard 200 chart.

Critical reception
The album received positive reviews from critics; according to Metacritic, it received a score of 70 out of 100, based on 16 reviews.

Accolades

Track listing
All songs were written by Holly Laessig and Jess Wolfe.

Personnel

Lucius
Jess Wolfe – Lead vocals
Holly Laessig – Lead vocals
Dan Molad – Drums
Peter Lalish – Guitar
Andrew Burri – Guitar

Additional musicians
Rob Moose – Strings

Production
Lucius – production
Shawn Everett – production, engineering
Bob Ezrin – production
Dan Molad – additional production, additional engineering
Brandon Bost – additional engineering
Tom Elmhirst – mixing
Joe Visciano – mixing, mix assistant
Bob Ludwig – mastering

Chart performance

References

2016 albums
Lucius (band) albums